Origine contrôlée (US title: Made in France) is a 2001 French comedy-drama film starring Ronit Elkabetz. It is also the debut French-language picture to star Elkabetz, famous for Hebrew-language roles in her native Israel. Elkabetz acquired French fluency after moving to France in 1997. The film was written and directed by Ahmed Bouchaala and Zakia Tahri. It was awarded the Le Roger Award for Best French Feature by the Avignon & New York Film Festival.

Plot synopsis
A bourgeois white man (Ligardes) finds himself the victim of mistaken identity when he dresses up in drag yet is mistaken by authorities for a criminal Algerian transsexual. During his overnight stay in jail he meets two strangers, a beur, Youssef (Kelif) and Sophia (Elkabetz), a woman seeking a sex-change operation. The eclectic trio embark on a hedonistic tour through Paris and the surrounding countryside, amidst the frivolities, and problems such as the immigration authorities and the police presence.

Casting
Elkabetz was cast in the starring role after directors Bouchaala and Tahri attended the closing night of her one-woman show in Paris playing Martha Graham.

Cast
Ronit Elkabetz as Sonia
Atmen Kalif as Youssef
Isabelle Sadoyan as Aunt
Patrick Ligardes as Patrick
El Kebir as Lamine
Alexia Stresi as Marie
Françoise Lépine as The Inspector
Joseph Malerba as Human resources director
Jean-Luc Porraz as The Lawyer

References

External links

Trailer

2001 films
Films set in France
2000s French-language films
Films about race and ethnicity
2001 comedy-drama films
2001 comedy films
2001 drama films
French comedy-drama films
2000s French films